Rajaram Mane (born 10 August 1960,  Mahuli in Dist. Sangli (Maharashtra)   ) is an Indian Administrative Service (I.A.S) officer of 2001 Batch, who has served on various key posts in Maharashtra like ZP CEO Ahmednagar and Beed, Collector-Kolhapur, Director General, Maharashtra Energy Development Agency (MEDA). Mane is currently posted as Divisional Commissioner of Nashik Division (North Maharashtra). During his tenure as Collector, Kolhapur he is credited for successfully managing the 2014 General and State Elections. In Kolhapur, Mane also handled the affairs of Mahalaxmi Devasthan Samiti and tried to bring transparency in day-to-day functioning of the organisation. He has played a pivotal role in development of Hinjewadi Phase-I in 2001 while working as Regional Officer, Pune MIDC. Mane's work at Beed Zilla Parishad is also widely appreciated. He is extremely popular for his honesty, speedy administrative work and has an excellent track record.

References

1960 births
India MPs 1977–1979
India MPs 1980–1984
India MPs 1984–1989
India MPs 1989–1991
India MPs 1991–1996
People from Kolhapur district
Lok Sabha members from Maharashtra
Living people